This is a list of television programs broadcast by Polynésie 1ère in French Polynesia.

Programs
20h30 en fêtes (8:30pm in Holidays)
20h30 le dimanche (Sunday 8:30pm)
300 choeurs pour les fêtes (300 Choirs for Holidays)
68
A ha amana o na : souviens-toi... (A Ha Amana O Na: Remember...)
A l'école de la savane (At the School of the Savannah)
A quatre mains (Four Hands)
Active ta vie ! Mangez, bougez, vivez (Activate Your Life! Eat, Move, Live)
Addiction : vivre sans (Addiction: Live Without)
ADN, la quête des origines (DNA, The Quest for Origins)
Afghanistan, l'héritage des French Doctors (Afghanistan, the Legacy of the French Doctors)
Agitateurs de goût (Taste Stirrers)
Ahitea
Aiu Himene Taua (Important Songs)
Amanda
Animaux extraordinaires (Extroardinary Animals)
Arabie sauvage (Wild Arabia)
Ariane et Barbe-Bleue (Ariane and Bluebeard)
Au coeur des rythmes d'un Noël antillais (In the Heart of the Rhythms of a Caribbean Christmas)
Aux armes Tahitiens (Tahitian Weapons)
Artistes de France (Artists from France)
Barbara, elle et nous (Barbara, She and Us)
Behind fashion
Bleu océan (Ocean Blue)
Blue Boat
Blue Water High: Surf Academy
Bons baisers de Moscou (Good Kisses from Moscow)
Boyard Land
Brokenwood
Ça commence aujourd'hui (It All Starts Today)
Ça ne sortira pas d'ici (It Will Not Come Out of Here)
Cash investigation (Cash Investigation)
Catalina * 2016
Cérémonie du 11 novembre (Ceremony of November 11)
C'est pas sorcier (This is Not Rocket Science)
Clips
Champions de France (sports, Champions of France)
Chorales de Noël (Christmas Corales)
Chris aux Vieilles Charrues (Chris at the Vieilles Charrues)
Chroniques d'en haut (Chronicles from Above)
Couleurs outremers (Overseas Colors)
Cuba, l'histoire secrète (Cuba, the Secret History)
Crossing Lines
Cuba, l'île sanctuaire (Cuba, the Sanctuary Island)
Dance in Paradise
Dans les yeux d'Olivier (In Oliver's Eyes)
Débat (Debate)
Des bateaux et des hommes (Boats and Men)
Des trains pas comme les autres (Trains Like No Other)
Des volcans et des îles (Volcanoes and Islands)
Destination Russia
Dieu m'est témoin (God is My Witness)
Drôlement bêtes : les animaux en questions (Funny Beasts: Animals in Question)
D'une île à l'autre (From One Island to Another)
Du soleil dans nos assiettes (Sun On Our Plates)
Echappées belles (Close Call)
Edition spéciale (Special Edition)
Elles aussi (They Too)
Explorations de l'extrême (Explorations of the Extreme)
Fare ma'ohi
Farereira'a time
Farewell, l'espion qui aimait la France (Farewell, the Spy Who Loved France)
FBI: Duo très spécial (FBI: Very Special Duo)
Festival des marquises 2019 (Marquises Festival 2019)
Football (Soccer)
Fos-sur-Mer, les révoltes de la pollution (Fos-sur-Mer, the Pollution Revolts)
Glee
Global Wheeling
Gosses de France
Guadeloupe, des cimes à l'océan (Guadeloupe, from the Peaks to the Ocean)
Ha'uti mai
Hine tai a, chroniques d'une famille de pêcheurs (Hine Tai A, Chronicles of a Fisherman's Family)
Holopuni va'a Hawaiki Nui voyage 2019 (Holopuni Va'a Hawaiki Nui Trip 2019)
Horizon Pacifique (Pacific Horizon)
How I Met Your Mother
Ile de Pâques, les Rapanui en résistance (Easter Island, the Rapanui in Resistance)
Impardonnable (Unforgivable)
Influences, une histoire de l'art au présent (Influences, A History of Art in the Present)
Investigatiôns (Investigations)
Islander's Tahiti
Jaguars en danger (Jaguars in Danger)
Je suis d'ici
Journal 20h00 (Newspaper 8:00pm)
Journal Polynésie (French Polynesia Newspaper)
JT Polynesia
Ker Domino
Kid reporters
Kings Casino
K-Ville
Heheu
Hospital IT
L'abécédaire de Noël 2019 (The 2019 Christmas Alphabet)
La bataille du miel (The Battle of Honey)
La famille Pirate (a cartoon, The Pirate Family)
La fête de la grenouille (The Frog Party)
La jeune fille et le ballon ovale (The Girl and the Oval Ball)
Le lagon de Mayotte : une autre idée du voyage (The Lagoon of Mayotte: Another Idea of the Trip)
La maison France 5 (The France 5 House)
La nuit des chorales du Pacifique (Pacific Choir Night)
La nuit des talents 2019 (The Night of Talents 2019)
La vie secrète des orques (The Secret Life of Orcs)
La virilité (Manlines)
La ora
La promesse (The Promise)
La virilité (Manlines)
L'affaire Markovic : coup bas chez les gaullistes (The Markovic Case: A Group with the Gaullists)
L'amour en gage (Love as a Pledge)
Le chalet (The Chalet)
Le Dino train (a cartoon, The Dino Train)
Le grand show de l'humour (The Big Show of Humor)
Le IIIe Reich n'aura pas la bombe (The Third Reich Will Not Have a Bomb)
Le monde selon Amazon (The World According to Amazon)
Le piment ne manque pas de piquant (The Pepper Does Not Miss Spicy)
Le plaidoyer d'Anote : les Kiribati, au bord de la noyade (Anoti's Plea: Kiribati, On the Verge of Drowning)
Le poids de la joie (The Weight of Joy)
Le prix de la passion (The Price of Passion)
Le refuge des orphelins sauvages (The Refuge of Wild Orphans)
Le Vaisseau fantôme (The Ghost Ship)
Léa Parker
L'enfant de tous les possibles (The Child of All Possibilities)
L'envers du paradis (The Reverse of Paradise)
Les amants magnifiques (Beautiful Lovers)
Les contes de Masha (a cartoon, Masha's Tales)
Les derniers jours de Franco (The Last Days of Franco)
Les écrivains, le silence et les chats (Writers, Silence and Cats)
Les forêts oubliées de Malaisie (The Forgotten Forests of Malaysia)
Les fous du funk (Fools of Funk)
Les frères rivaux 
Les Griffin (The Griffin)
Les hommes de Billancourt (The Men of Billancourt)
Les liens de sang (Blood Ties)
Les ombres du passé (The Shadows of the Past)
Les plantes vertes comestibles du Pacifique (Green Edible Plants of the Pacific)
Les plus beaux ponts du monde (The Most Beautiful Bridges in the World)
Les routes de l'impossible (The Roads of the Impossible)
Les témoins d'outre-mer (Overseas Witnesses)
Les trésors cachés des variétés (Hidden Treasures of Varieties)
Les trésors des arts de la table (The Treasure of the Arts of the Table)
Les triplés (a cartoon, The Triplets)
Les trois visages d'Ana (The Three Faces of Ana)
Lie to Me
L'Indonésie sauvage (Wild Indonesia)
LoliRock (a cartoon)
Malama tagata Wallis
Ma'ohi nui, terre de marchandises (Ma'ohi Nui, Land of Merchandise)
Mara, une femme unique (Mara, a Unique Woman)
Martin Matin (a cartoon, Martin Morning)
Masha et Michka (a cartoon, Masha and Michka)
Mata'Ara(also known as Mata ara)
Ma vie à côté de la centrale (My Life Next to the Power Plant)
Mega la blague (Mega the Joke)
Mémoires de rue (Street Memories)
Mentalist
Météo (Weather, in Tahitian)
Messe de Noël (Christmas Mass)
MI-5
Miss Tahiti 2018
Miss Univers 2019 (Miss Universe 2019)
Modern Family
Modules CPME (CPME Modules)
Mofy (a cartoon)
Molusco (a cartoon)
Motus
Nous, gens de la terre (We, People of Earth)
Nouvelle-Calédonie, l'archipel aux sabots rois (New Caledonia, Archipelago with Hooves Kings)
Nouvelle-Calédonie, les pépites du lagon (New Caledonia, the Nuggets of the Lagoon)
Ono'u 2017
Ono'u 2018
Ori Tahiti Nui Compétitions 2018 (Ori Tahiti Nui Competitions 2018)
Outremer tout court (Overseas Anyway)
Parents mode d'emploi (Parents' Instructions)
Pari pari fenua
Paris, années folles (Paris, Roaring Twenties)
Patitifa
Patutiki, l'art du tatouage des îles Marquises (Patutiki, the Tattoo Art of the Marquesas Islands)
Peherau
Personne n'y avait pensé ! (Nobody Thought of It!)
Peut-on rire de tout ? (Can We Laugh at Everything?)
Pierre Desproges, une plume dans le culte (Pierre Desproges, a Feather in the Cult)
Place aux jeunes (Young People)
Plus belle la vie (More Beautiful Life)
Police District (District Police)
Police scientifique, le crime à la loupe (Police, Crime with a Magnifying Glass)
Polynés'îles
Precious Pearl
Prison Break
Radio Vison
Rosewood
Regards
Rizzoli & Isles
Rugby
Sah Ke Bon Camera
Sale temps pour la planète (Dirty Weather for the Planet)
Samba et Leuk le lièvre (Samba and Leuk the Hare)
Samedi d'en rire (Saturday to Laugh)
Sans tabu
Scandola
Scolopendres et papillons (Scolopendres and Butterflies)
Shots Fired
Slam
Sports nautiques (Nautical Sports)
Spot prévention routière (Road Safety Spot)
Sur écoute (Bugged)
Surpoids à La Réunion : des maux et des combats (Overweight in Reunion: Ills and Fighting)
Sydney Fox, l'aventurière (Sydney Fox, the Adventurer)
Tama himene
Tamerlano
Taratata
Te hono tu'aro
Te Pina I nui
Te ve a porotetani
The Americans
The Fall
The Good Karma Hospital
The Queen of Flow
This Is Us
Tikehau, les enfants du lagon (Tikehau, Children of the Lagoon)
Toi, mon amour (You, My Love)
Total Praise
Toulouse-Lautrec, vivre et peindre à en mourir (Toulouse-Lautrec, Live and Paint to Death)
Tout le monde veut prendre sa place (Everyone Wants to Take His Place)
Toutankhamon, les secrets du pharaon (Tutankhaman, the Secrets of Pharaoh)
Tropical gourmett
Tu'aro Sport, le mag
Ultramarins, ultraterriens
Underground
Un si grand soleil (Such a Big Sun)
Vaipehe 2019
Vanuatu : Troc, coutumes et dents de cochon (Vanuatu: Barter, Customs, and Pig Teeth)
Variations
Ve'a Tahiti (in Tahitian)
Vertige aux Marquises (Vertigo in the Marquises)
Vevo le grand rendez-vous (Vevo the Grand Date)
Victoria
Vues d'en haut (Views from Above)
Wallis-et-Futuna : un héritage culturel commun (Wallis and Futuna: A Common Cultural Heritage)
Waterman Tahiti Tour 2019
Wildflower
Wonderful Town
XV/15 (rugby)
Zik Truck
Zou (a cartoon)

References

Polynesie 1ere